Edison's Medicine is a song by American hard rock band Tesla that was released as a single in 1991 from their third studio album Psychotic Supper. The song peaked at No. 20 on Billboard's Mainstream Rock chart.

The song is about Nikola Tesla's rivalry with Thomas Edison.

Charts

References

Tesla (band) songs
1991 singles
1991 songs
Geffen Records singles